Conasprella berschaueri is a species of sea snail, a marine gastropod mollusc in the family Conidae, the cone snails, cone shells or cones.

This species was named after David Berschauer, editor of the malacological journal The Festivus.

Description
The size of the shell attains 16 mm.

Distribution
This species occurs in the Caribbean Sea off St. Maarten, West Indies

References

 Petuch E.J. & Myers R.F. (2014) New species of Conidae and Conilithidae (Gastropoda: Conoidea) from the Bahamas, eastern Caribbean, and Brazil. Xenophora Taxonomy 3: 26-46.
  Puillandre N., Duda T.F., Meyer C., Olivera B.M. & Bouchet P. (2015). One, four or 100 genera? A new classification of the cone snails. Journal of Molluscan Studies. 81: 1-23

External links
 World Register of Marine Species
 Gastropods.com: Jaspidiconus berschaueri

berschaueri
Gastropods described in 2014